Javanese New Caledonians are an ethnic group of full or partial Javanese descent in New Caledonia. They have been present since between 1896 and 1949. They were sent  as plantation workers administrated by the Dutch colonial government in New Caledonia.

They form less than 1.6% of New Caledonia's population. New Caledonia is a home for Javanese diaspora, besides Suriname, Malaysia and Singapore.

Most Javanese New Caledonians could not speak Indonesian, but are fluent in Javanese New Caledonian language.

See also
Javanese people

References

Javanese people
N
 
Ethnic groups in New Caledonia
New Caledonian culture
New Caledonian people of Indonesian descent